Victaphanta is a genus of carnivorous air-breathing land snails, terrestrial pulmonate gastropod mollusks in the family Rhytididae.

Distribution
This genus is endemic to Australia and occurs in Victoria and Tasmania

Species
Species within the genus Victaphanta include:
 Victaphanta atramentaria
 Victaphanta compacta
 Victaphanta lampra
 Victaphanta milligani

References

 Iredale, T. 1933. Systematic notes on Australian land shells. Records of the Australian Museum 19: 37-59
 Smith, B.J. 1969. A comparative study of two Australian paryphantid snails, with notes on their taxonomic relationships. pp. 164–169 in Rao, K.V. (ed.). Marine Biological Association of India, Symposium on Mollusca. Pt 1. Mandapan Camp : Marine Biological Association of India.
 Smith, B.J. & Kershaw, R.C. 1972. Tasmanian snails referred to the genus Victaphanta (Stylomatophora : Paryphantidae). Memoirs of the National Museum of Victoria, Melbourne 33: 111-114
 Smith, B.J. & Kershaw, R.C. 1979. Field Guide to the Non-marine Molluscs of South-eastern Australia. Canberra : A.N.U. Press 285 pp
 Smith, B.J. 1992. Non-Marine Mollusca. In, Houston, W.W.K. (ed.). Zoological Catalogue of Australia. Non-marine Mollusca. Canberra : Australian Government Publishing Service Vol. 8 xii 408 pp

Rhytididae
Gastropods of Australia
Taxonomy articles created by Polbot